Abington Township may refer to:

Places in the United States
 Abington Township, Mercer County, Illinois
 Abington Township, Wayne County, Indiana
 Abington Township, Lackawanna County, Pennsylvania, former name for Waverly Township
 Abington Township, Montgomery County, Pennsylvania

See also
 North Abington Township, Pennsylvania
 West Abington Township, Pennsylvania
 South Abington Township, Pennsylvania
 Abington (disambiguation)
 Abingdon (disambiguation)

Township name disambiguation pages